Tomnolen is an unincorporated community located in Webster County, Mississippi, United States, along U.S. Route 82.

References

Unincorporated communities in Webster County, Mississippi
Unincorporated communities in Mississippi